Niastella gongjuensis  is a Gram-negative and aerobic bacterium from the genus of Niastella which has been isolated from soil from a greenhouse from Gongju in Korea.

References 

Chitinophagia
Bacteria described in 2015